The Australia women's national cricket team toured New Zealand in February and March 1995. They played against New Zealand and India in the New Zealand Women's Centenary Tournament, an ODI tri-series, finishing bottom of the group. The matches played against New Zealand in the tri-series were played for the Rose Bowl, which was drawn 1–1. They then played against New Zealand in one Test match, which was drawn.

Squads

Tri-Series

Group stage

Only WTest

See also
 1994–95 New Zealand Women's Centenary Tournament

References

External links
Australia Women tour of New Zealand 1994/95 from Cricinfo

Women's international cricket tours of New Zealand
Australia women's national cricket team tours
1995 in women's cricket